Merry Lees was a railway station on the Leicester to Burton upon Trent Line in Leicestershire. It was opened in 1832 and closed in 1871.

The Leicester and Swannington Railway opened the first Merry Lees station on 18 July 1832. The Midland Railway took over the line in 1845 and replaced the station with a second one  to the north on 27 March 1848. The Midland renamed the station Merrylees station some time thereafter, and closed it on 1 March 1871. For the entire period from 1832 to 1871 the station was run by a station mistress, Mary Argyle.

References

Former Midland Railway stations
Disused railway stations in Leicestershire
Railway stations in Great Britain opened in 1832
Railway stations in Great Britain closed in 1871